Vaalhoek is a village in Kgalagadi District of Botswana. It is located at the southern tip of Botswana, close to the border with South Africa, and it has a primary school. The population counted 355 in the 2011 census.

References

Kgalagadi District
Villages in Botswana